The Screech Owl Sanctuary and Animal Park is a home for owls and other animals  located near St Columb Major in Cornwall, England. It was founded in 1990 by Carolyn Screech.

References

External links

Official Site

Tourist attractions in Cornwall
Aviaries
Animal shelters
Nature conservation organisations based in the United Kingdom
Buildings and structures in Cornwall
Articles needing infobox zoo
Organizations established in 1990